
Gmina Wiskitki is a rural gmina (administrative district) in Żyrardów County, Masovian Voivodeship, in east-central Poland.

The gmina contains part of the protected area called Bolimów Landscape Park.

Villages
Gmina Wiskitki contains the villages and settlements of Aleksandrów, Antoniew, Babskie Budy, Cyganka, Czerwona Niwa, Czerwona Niwa-Parcel, Duninopol, Działki, Feliksów, Franciszków, Guzów, Guzów-Osada, Hipolitów, Janówek, Jesionka, Józefów, Kamionka, Kamionka Mała, Łubno, Miedniewice, Miedniewice-Kolonia, Miedniewice-Łąki, Miedniewice-Parcela, Morgi, Nowa Wieś, Nowe Kozłowice, Nowy Drzewicz, Nowy Oryszew, Oryszew-Osada, Podbuszyce, Podoryszew, Popielarnia, Prościeniec, Różanów, Siarkowiec, Smolarnia, Sokule, Stara Wieś, Stare Kozłowice, Starowiskitki, Starowiskitki-Parcel, Stary Drzewicz, Stary Hipolitów, Tomaszew, Wiskitki and Wola Miedniewska.

Neighbouring gminas
Gmina Wiskitki is bordered by the town of Żyrardów and by the gminas of Baranów, Bolimów, Jaktorów, Nowa Sucha, Puszcza Mariańska, Radziejowice and Teresin.

References
Polish official population figures 2006

Wiskitki
Żyrardów County